Hareid is a municipality in Møre og Romsdal county, Norway. It is part of the Sunnmøre region. The administrative centre is the village of Hareid. The other main population centers are Brandal and Hjørungavåg.

The municipality is situated off the mainland coast of Sunnmøre, on an island named Hareidlandet, which it shared with Ulstein Municipality, the commercial capital of the area. Hareid is regarded as the cultural capital with its annual Hareidsstemne and many choirs. It is also an important traffic hub in Sunnmøre and is connected by ferry to the neighboring island of Sula which in turn is connected to the city of Ålesund and the island of Valderøya. The municipality is connected to the mainland via the Eiksund Bridge and Eiksund Tunnel through Ulstein.

The  municipality is the 336th largest by area out of the 356 municipalities in Norway. Hareid is the 180th most populous municipality in Norway with a population of 5,126.

General information

The municipality of Hareid was established on 1 January 1917 when it was separated from Ulstein Municipality to form a municipality of its own. Originally, the municipality included the eastern part of Hareidlandet island and the southwestern part of the nearby island of Sula. The initial population of the municipality was 2,310. On 1 July 1958, the southwestern part of the island of Sula (population: 68) was transferred from Hareid Municipality to Borgund Municipality.

Name
The municipality (originally the parish) is named after the old Hareid farm, since the first Hareid Church was built there. The meaning of the name of the island is unknown. It is however speculated that it might be connected to the Norse god Höðr.

Coat of arms
The coat of arms was granted on 11 January 1985. The arms show three arrowheads in white on a blue background. The arrowheads were chosen as a symbol for the Battle of Hjörungavágr in 986, in which Earl Håkon defeated the Danish Vikings. This battle played an important role in the struggle by Håkon to unite the whole of Norway. Since the battle took place in the municipality, the arrowheads were considered an appropriate symbol.

Churches
The Church of Norway has one parish within the municipality of Hareid. It is part of the Søre Sunnmøre prosti (deanery) in the Diocese of Møre.

Government
All municipalities in Norway, including Hareid, are responsible for primary education (through 10th grade), outpatient health services, senior citizen services, unemployment and other social services, zoning, economic development, and municipal roads. The municipality is governed by a municipal council of elected representatives, which in turn elect a mayor.  The municipality falls under the Møre og Romsdal District Court and the Frostating Court of Appeal.

Municipal council
The municipal council of Hareid is made up of 21 representatives that are elected to four year terms. The party breakdown of the council is as follows:

Mayor
The mayors of Hareid (incomplete list):
2019–present: Bernt Brandal (LL)
2011-2019: Anders Riise (H)
2007-2011: Hans Gisle Holstad (Ap)
1999-2007: Gunn Berit Gjerde (V)
1992-1999: Einar Holm (V)
1990-1991: Olav Fure (KrF)
1988-1990: Johan E. Hareide (H)
1984-1987: Olav Fure (KrF)
1976-1983: Einar Holm (V)
1972-1976: Endre Hareide (KrF)
1968-1971: Ola L. Grønevet (V)
1956-1967: Sverre A. Riise (Sp)
1952-1955: Håkon A. Riise (Ap)

Economy

Primary industries
Primary industries such as fisheries and agriculture have traditionally been important ways of life in Hareid, and continue to be so for some of the population.

Industry
In recent years Hareid has developed into a modern industrial municipality with a variety of industries, including furniture, fish farming, offshore and subsea ship systems, and other manufacturers of ship equipment. Many Hareid companies specialize in manufacturing maritime equipment and components, and are part of the maritime cluster of Sunnmøre. Such clusters are considered by the EU to be powerful engines of economic development and drivers for innovation in Europe.

Industrial companies
Ekornes (furniture)
Hareid Group (electrical systems)
Jets (vacuum sanitation)
Kvalsvik Produksjon (kitchen furniture)
Libra Plast (ship doors)
Norway Pelagic (fish processing plant)
Rolls-Royce Marine (maritime equipment)
Spenncon (precast concrete)
Stromek (maritime equipment)
Vital Base (specialized pillows and cushions)

Education
The municipal centre of Hareid is home to Hareid elementary school and Hareid junior high school, with two more elementary schools in more rural parts of the municipality.
Hareid elementary school, grades 1 through 7
Bigset elementary school, grades 1 through 7
Hjørungavåg elementary school, grades 1 through 7
Hareid junior high school, grades 8 through 10

After finishing junior high school in Hareid, students can complete a high school education in one of Hareid's neighbouring communities such as Ulsteinvik or Ålesund.

Notable people 
 Marie Lovise Widnes (born 1930) a poet, author, singer, composer and local politician in Hareid
 Kjell Magne Yri (born 1943 in Hareid) a Norwegian priest, linguist and translator
 Åge Hareide (born 1953 in Hareid) a former footballer with 266 club caps and 50 for Norway and national team manager for Norway, 2003–2008 & Denmark, 2016–2020
 Fredrik Aursnes (born 1995 in Hareid) a footballer with over 240 club caps

References

External links
Official municipality website 

Municipal fact sheet from Statistics Norway 

 
Municipalities of Møre og Romsdal
1917 establishments in Norway